Raghbir Singh (1895-1955 January 7) was an Indian politician, freedom fighter who served as 2nd Chief Minister of erstwhile PEPSU state.

Raghbir Singh born in a village of the Lahore in 1895 came from the lineage of Sardar Sahib Singh and Sardar Lakkha Singh the two were responsible for early upbringing and education in use of arms of then Maharaja Ranjit Singh of Sikh Empire.

He was ushered into services in Patiala State by Maharaja Bhupinder Singh where he went on to become the Inspector General of Police in 1926. Raghbir Singh played a pivotal role in bringing about a compromise between state and Akali movement during the uprising of 1942 soon after he found the political party Lok Seva Sabha that latter merged into Indian National Congress and then became the home minister in PEPSU state

He was appointed as the 2nd Premier of State after the resignation of Rarewala as Premier but in 1952 assembly election Congress failed to got majority and Rarewala became the first Chief Minister of PEPSU. After a brief period of President rule in State in 1954 assembly election Congress got majority and he became the 2nd Chief Minister of State and hold the office till his death on 7 January 1955.

References

Indian National Congress politicians from Punjab, India
Punjab, India politicians
Punjabi people
1895 births
1955 deaths
People from Punjab, India
Chief ministers of Indian states